The 1979 Kansas Jayhawks football team represented the University of Kansas in the Big Eight Conference during the 1979 NCAA Division I-A football season. After a four year absence, Don Fambrough returned as the team's head coach, and the Jayhawks compiled a 3–8 record (2–5 against conference opponents), tied for fifth place in the conference, and were outscored by opponents by a combined total of 346 to 172. They played their home games at Memorial Stadium in Lawrence, Kansas.

The team's statistical leaders included Brian Bethke with 874 passing yards, Harry Sydney with 541 rushing yards, and David Verser with 463 receiving yards. Brian Bethke, Mike Gay, and Monty Carbonell were the team captains.

Schedule

Roster

References

Kansas
Kansas Jayhawks football seasons
Kansas Jayhawks football